Southern Carrier may refer to:

Southern Carrier people, see Dakelh
Southern Carrier (language), a dialect in the Carrier language
Courrier sud (novel), 1929 novel by Antoine de Saint-Exupéry

See also
Southern (disambiguation)
Carrier (disambiguation)
Courrier sud (disambiguation)

Language and nationality disambiguation pages